Rotuma lewisi, or Lewis's wriggler, is a species of fish in the family Xenisthmidae, which is regarded as a synonymous with the Eleotridae. Rotuma is a monotypic genus. The generic name refers to the volcanic island of Rotuma, north of Fiji while the specific name honours  Anthony D. Lewis, a Fisheries Officer of the Government of Fiji who supported Springer's field work in Fiji. It has been recorded from Fiji, Tonga, the Santa Cruz Islands, the Comoros Islands, and the Chesterfield Islands.

Distribution
Southwest Pacific.

References

Xenisthmidae
Eleotridae
Fish described in 1988